The Last Voyage is an exclusive to audio Doctor Who story, produced as part of BBC Books' New Series Adventures line, and the sixth entry in the series to be produced. Written by author Dan Abnett and read by David Tennant, it features the Tenth Doctor travelling alone. It was released on 5 January 2010 and originally supposed to be the Tenth Doctor's final story, but was followed by Dead Air.

Synopsis
The Doctor lands the TARDIS on a space cruiser on its maiden voyage. This story bears a similarity to "The Langoliers" by Stephen King, where people disappear without cause.

References

Audiobooks based on Doctor Who
Tenth Doctor audio plays
2010 audio plays
Works by Dan Abnett